Mulugu district is a district in the Indian state of Telangana. Its headquarters is the town of Mulugu. Mulugu district is the least populated district with 2,94,671 in the state. Mulugu district has the fewest mandals in the state with nine mandals. It currently borders Warangal, Mahabubabad, Jayashankar and Bhadradri districts and with the state of Chhattisgarh.

Government and politics 
Mulugu Major was constituted in 2011 and is classified as a second grade municipality.

Politics 
Mulugu district has one seat in State Assembly and is reserved for Scheduled Tribe. Seethakka (Danasari Anasuya) was elected as MLA Mulug (ST) (Assembly constituency) in the 2018 General Elections.

Mulugu District falls under Mahabubabad (Lok Sabha constituency). Smt Kavitha Maloth was elected as MP in May 2019 General Elections.

Weather 

Mulugu has a semi-tropical climate. During summers, the temperatures soar to more than 48 °C. In winters, temperatures range between 12 °C and 27 °C. Mulugu receives the northeast and the southwest monsoon, from June to September, and from October to November respectively. It mainly relies on the monsoons and rainfall.

Media 

Mulugu has print and entertainment media and Mulugu Cable, a local entertainment channel for broadcasting TV.

Print media 
The leading newspapers,  Namasthe Telangana, Sakshi, Eenadu, [[Velugu{V6}]] Vaartha, Andhra Jyothi, Prajasakti, Andhra Bhoomi, The Hindu, Deccan Chronicle, and Times Of India are available. Sirachukka is the local tabloid circulated weekly.

Transport 

Mulugu is welly connected with road routes to every other place of the state and the nation and has National Highway 163 passing from Mulugu to Chhattisgarh.

Roadways 
Mulugu has a TSRTC bus stand with a 5 bus capacity. It has many services for the needs of the citizens. It falls on the main route of Warangal-Bhadrachalam. Nearly 20,000 people use this daily through the bus facilities. In addition, many seven-seat autorickshaws and commander jeeps connect the nearby villages.

Places of interest
 Ramappa Temple
 Medaram Jathara
 Bogatha Waterfall
 Tadvai Forest Huts
 Laknavaram Lake and Boating
 Mallur Sri Hemachala Lakshmi Narasimha Swamy Temple
 Mulugu fossil site near Bhupathipur village

Demographics 

The population of Mulugu is around 2,57,744 according to the reports of the 2011 Indian Census. The literacy rate is 79.17%, more than national average 74%.
Male literacy is 86.59%, which is more than national average of 82.10%, and female literacy rate is 72.32%, more than national average 65.50%.

The primary language spoken is Telugu. Telugu and English are used in official communications and media of instructions. Lambadi is also a sizeable minority language spoken in Mulugu.

The majority of the villages and the hamlets including the city of Mulugu are the habitats of scheduled tribes (75%). The highest tribal community population are the Lambadis. Thus, the majority of people of the district will communicate in the special tribal language, Lambadi or Banjara (60%). It is one of the officially recognized dialects by the Indian government.

Healthcare 
The 100-bed Mini Mahatma Gandhi Memorial Hospital is the largest hospital in both the city and district of Mulugu. It also serves the needs of patients from the neighbouring districts.

Apart from major public hospitals, such as those for maternity, chest, and tuberculosis, there are many private specialist hospitals including Appaiah, Ravinder, Star, Superspeciality, Area Hospital, and St. Ann's.

References

External links 
 Official website

Districts of Telangana
Mulugu district